Simona Bordoni (born 1972) is an Italian climatologist and professor of environmental science and engineering who runs the Simona Bordoni Research Group at California Institute of Technology. She studies atmospheric dynamics, with a special emphasis on understanding the coupling between larger-scale circulations and the hydrological cycle.

Career 
Bordoni received her M.Sc  in Atmospheric Sciences from UCLA in 2003, and her PhD in Atmospheric and Oceanic Sciences from UCLA in 2007.

Bordoni and Tapio Schneider have a highly cited paper on the onset of the Asian monsoon that used an idealised climate model to show that the monsoon is a rapid transition between two circulation regions. Simone has also worked with Salvatore Pascale to study the weakening of the North American monsoon and its consequences for regional water resources. Her analysis of ocean winds over the Gulf of California and northeast Pacific Ocean identified that the onset of the summer season is accompanied by a seasonal reversal of the wind flow along the Gulf.

Areas of Interest 
Monsoons, Tropical dynamics, Climate Dynamics Interactions between mesoscale and large-scale circulations

Awards 

 2014 ISSNAF (Italian Scientists and Scholars of North America Foundation) Young Scientist Award in Environmental Sciences
 2009 James R. Holton Junior Scientist Award

References

External links

1972 births
Living people
American climatologists
Women climatologists
American women earth scientists
University of California, Los Angeles alumni
California Institute of Technology faculty
21st-century American scientists
21st-century American women scientists
American women academics